Nepali National Congress was a political party in Nepal. It was formed by B. P. Koirala, Matrika Prasad Koirala, Ganesh Man Singh, Krishna Prasad Bhattarai, Mahendra Narayan Nidhi and others.

It merged with the Nepal Democratic Congress led by Suvarna Shamsher Rana on 27 Chaitra 2006 to form present day Nepali Congress. Both the parties had the same ideology of establishment of democracy.

History

Formation 
In 1947, Bishweshwar Prasad Koirala, published an appeal for a unified struggle of Nepali people against the Rana regime. That same year, some Nepalese got together in Benaras and formed an organization by the name All Indian Nepali National Congress where an ad-hoc committee was established. The initial officers were chairman Devi Prasad Sapkota, vice-president Balchandra Sharma, general secretary Krishna Prasad Bhattarai, and public minister Gopal Prasad Bhattarai, publicity minister. Its Working Committee included Batuk Prasad Bhattarai, Narayan Prasad Bhattarai, and Narendra Regmi, while its coordinator was Bishweshwar Prasad Koirala.

Around the same time, Nepalese located in Calcutta formed another organization by the name All Indian Nepali Gorkha Congress whose chairman was Dharma Narayan Pradhan. Koirala traveled extensively to places such as Benaras, Calcutta, Darjeeling, Assam, Bhaksu, and Dehradhun, and established contact with the Nepalese there. He met with Ganesh Man Singh during the same period. Nepalese representatives from different areas of Nepal and India organized one session in Calcutta. Koirala, Dilli Raman Regmi, Dharma Narayan Pradhan, and Dhan Man Singh Pariyar were present. In the same session, dropping Akhil Bharatiya from its name, the organization was named Nepali National Congress. Tanka Prasad Acharya, who was facing a life-sentence in Kathmandu, was made its chairman. The flag was square-shaped with white, blue, and red colors in succession, with the moon and the sun in its center.

The major four proposals passed by the session were to assist Indians in their independence movement, support Vietnam struggling for freedom against French colonization, ask for the immediate release of imprisoned members of the Nepal Praja Parishad, and initiate a non-violence movement in Nepal for the establishment of an accountable ruling system. The organization's modus operandi was chosen, and attached itself to the civil conscience process in Nepal by establishing Tanka Prasad Acharya as its chairman.

Nepali Congress formation, 1946–1950 
The Nepali Congress Party was formed by the merger of Nepali National Congress and Nepal Democratic Congress. The Nepali National Congress was founded by Matrika Prasad Koirala in Calcutta, India on 25 January 1946. The Nepal Democratic Congress was founded by Subarna Shumsher Rana in Calcutta on 4 August 1948. The two parties merged on 10 April 1950 to form the Nepali Congress and Koirala became its first president. The party called for an armed revolution against the Rana regime.

During the Bairgania Conference in Bairgania, Bihar, on 27 September 1950 the Nepali Congress announced an armed revolution against the Rana regime. The president of the party also announced the liquidation of operations in India and that the party would operate only inside Nepal.

After King Tribhuvan took refuge inside the Indian Embassy on 6 November 1950. The Congress Liberation Army decided to take this opportunity to launch attacks against the regime before the King "left Nepalese soil". Matrika and Bisheshwor Prasad Koirala and Subarna Shamsher Rana flew to Purnia, Bihar. They called the commanders posted at different locations inside Nepal to prepare for armed strikes near the Nepal-India border.

On 11 November 1950, at midnight Birgunj was attacked, and by 12 November it fell to the Nepali Congress and the first "People's Government" was declared. The liberation army was able to control most of the eastern hills of Nepal and the town of Tansen in Palpa. After pressure by the Indian government and the mass movement by the Nepali Congress and other political parties, the Rana government finally submitted to their demands and King Tribhuvan returned to the throne, replacing King Gyanendra, who had been crowned king after King Tribhuvan left for India.

See also 

 Nepali Congress
 Nepal Democratic Congress
 B. P. Koirala

References 

Political parties in Nepal
Defunct political parties in Nepal
Nepali Congress